The San Francisco Girls Chorus, established in 1978 by Elizabeth Appling and celebrating its 40th anniversary during the 2018-2019 Season, is a leading regional center for music education and performance for young women, ages 4–18, based in San Francisco. Each year, more than 300 singers from 45 Bay Area cities participate in SFGC's programs. The organization consists of a professional-level performance, recording, and touring ensemble and a six-level Chorus School training program. A leading voice on the Bay Area and national music scenes, the Chorus has produced award-winning concerts, recordings, and tours, empowered young women in music and other fields, enhanced and expanded the field of music for treble voices and set the international standard for the highest level of performance and education. The Chorus has been the recipient of 5 GRAMMY Awards, 4 Chorus America/ASCAP Awards for Adventurous Programming of Contemporary Music, and the Margaret Hillis Award for Choral Excellence from Chorus America (the first youth chorus to receive this prestigious award). SFGC's Chorus School has been described as "a model in the country for training girls' voices" by the California Arts Council.

Commissions of new works from the leading composers of our time, collaborations with renowned guest artists, and partnerships with other Bay Area and national arts organizations provide the young women of SFGC with unparalleled performance experiences among powerful adult role models. In addition to its annual engagements with the San Francisco Opera and San Francisco Symphony, recent and upcoming artistic partnerships include the New York Philharmonic's Biennial Festival of New Music at Lincoln Center in June 2016 in collaboration with The Knights orchestra, SHIFT: A Festival of American Orchestras in April 2017 at the John F. Kennedy Center for the Performing Arts in Washington, DC, and Carnegie Hall in February 2018 with the Philip Glass Ensemble, for a sold-out performance that was broadcast around the world by Medici TV.

The 2018-2019 Season marks SFGC's first year under the leadership of new Artistic Director, Valerie Sainte-Agathe. Previous Artistic Directors during SFGC's illustrious 40-year history include Elizabeth Appling (1978-1992), Sharon J. Paul (1992-2000), Magen Solomon (2000, interim), Susan McMane (2001-2012), Brandon Brack (2012, interim), and SFGC alumna Lisa Bielawa (2013-2018).

The Chorus School
SFGC's Chorus School, founded by Elizabeth Avakian, offers a program of unparalleled artistic and educational excellence, designed to take young women from their first introduction to the art of choral singing through a full course of choral, vocal, and theoretical instruction. The Chorus School is made up of six levels: non-auditioned Prep Chorus, Training Chorus, and Levels I-IV, which choristers move through as they develop musically. Choristers spend one, two or three years in each level. The carefully structured training stages are designed specifically to increase technical skills, stamina and discipline in accordance with each chorister's age and physical development.

Prep Chorus is SFGC's non-auditioned chorus for young singers ages 4–7. Prep Chorus provides choristers the opportunity to develop their voices and musicianship in an exciting, positive, age-appropriate atmosphere. Students are introduced to unison choral music and beginning vocal technique. Repertoire selection encompasses a wide variety of genres, including classical, folk, sacred, secular, and multicultural. Singers will take first steps in reading from a choral octavo, increasing their ability to read both words and music. Students build listening and memory skills through weekly practice, and develop confidence and stage presence in preparation for their final performance. 
Training Chorus, new for the 2018-2019 Chorus School year, is for singers 6–7 years of age. This auditioned ensemble is designed to serve as a bridge between SFGC's non-auditioned Prep Chorus, which meets once a week for 45 minutes, and Chorus School Level I, which meets twice a week for 2 hours. Training Chorus classes will include vocal technique, movement, sight singing, and an hour of choral repertoire. The class will be led by SFGC's expert choral, music theory, and vocal faculty. Choral repertoire will be dynamic, fun, diverse, and accessible for all singers continuing from SFGC's Prep Chorus or for any young girls who are interested in exploring choral singing.
Level I is an ensemble of choristers ages 7–9. In Level I, choristers are expected to, among other things, master the basics of vocal technique through developing the use of both their head and chest voice, demonstrating the ability to match pitch and sing in tune consistently, and maintaining correct singing posture. They also work to master the basics of music reading and aural skills, including reading all the notes on the treble staff, and a beginning knowledge of solfege, intervals, and rhythmic patterns. Level I choristers are also expected to develop an appropriate attention span, work together with other choristers, and demonstrate an appropriate level of social and emotional maturity. 
Level II is an ensemble of choristers ages 8–12. In Level II, choristers build on the skills developed in Level I. Level II choristers continue to develop their vocal technique through gained knowledge of the parts of the vocal mechanism, an understanding of resonance and breathing, and an increased knowledge of vowel formation and IPA (International Phonetic Alphabet).
Level III is an ensemble of choristers ages 9–13, Level III choristers delve deeper into the topics above, as the cumulative work of the Chorus School continues. In terms of vocal technique, Level III choristers are expected to be able to describe the physiological process of singing with basic terminology and understand how vowels and consonants are correctly produced. They also are expected to be able to sing with resonant tone, and be able to begin to critique the vocal production, performance, and posture of their peers.
Level IV is the most accomplished ensemble representing the San Francisco Girls Chorus School, composed of choristers ages 10–16. As such, choristers are expected not only to master many concepts in all areas of the curriculum, but to demonstrate their mastery through testing and evaluation. All Level IV choristers receive small-group and individual vocal instruction and, as a result, are expected to demonstrate a high level of vocal mastery.

Level IV choristers must pass a Qualifying Exam in both music theory and sight singing in order to be considered for graduation from the Chorus School. Music theory elements of this exam include construction and identification of all commonly- used scales, intervals, triads, seventh chords, and inversions. It also includes demonstration of a knowledge of cadences, simple forms, and bass clef. Aural Skills elements of this exam include sight singing in 3 to 4 parts, in a major or minor key, with diatonic steps, skips and accidentals. As graduates from the Chorus School are expected to be representatives of a comprehensive choral music education, Level IV choristers are expected to demonstrate the highest level of commitment in the Chorus School through attendance and independent study. They are also expected to comport themselves with dignity and grace through rehearsal and concert situations and to represent the Chorus School throughout the community.

Level IV choristers are increasingly invited to participate in professional-level performance opportunities, and enthusiasm for and dedication to these opportunities is part of full participation in Level IV. Level IV appears annually in productions of the San Francisco Opera and will, for a second year in a row during the 2018-2019 Season, perform as the chorus and in the title role of Little Prince for Opera Parallele's production of Rachel Portman's The Little Prince. Level IV has also recently performed with Kronos Quartet for KRONOS FESTIVAL 2018 and at the Kennedy Center with The Knights for SHIFT: A Festival of American Orchestras. Many of these singers performed in the San Francisco Symphony's “An American Journey with Charles Ives," which earned a GRAMMY Award.

More detail about the curriculum can be found here: SFGC: Curriculum

Premier Ensemble

The Premier Ensemble is the concert, recording, and touring ensemble of the San Francisco Girls Chorus, and is conducted by Artistic Director Valerie Sante-Agathe. The dedicated young artists of the ensemble, ages 12–18, present a season concert series in the San Francisco Bay Area, tour nationally and internationally, and appear regularly with renowned artistic partners, including the San Francisco Opera and San Francisco Symphony. The Premier Ensemble has also performed with numerous esteemed Bay Area ensembles such as New Century Chamber Orchestra, San Francisco Ballet, San Francisco Film Festival, Chanticleer, Kronos Quartet, Berkeley Symphony, ODC/Dance, the Joe Goode Performance Group, Berkeley Ballet Theater, San Francisco Contemporary Music Players, and others.

Regularly serving as cultural ambassadors for the Bay Area, the Premier Ensemble has undertaken ten international tours. In July 2007, the ensemble represented the United States in the World Vision Children's Choir Festival in Seoul, South Korea, and in the Gateway to Music Festival at the Forbidden City Concert Hall in Beijing. In August 2005, the Premier Ensemble was invited to perform at the prestigious 7th World Symposium on Choral Music in Kyoto and also at the Pacific Music Festival in Sapporo, Japan.

The Premier Ensemble performed at the inauguration of President Barack Obama in January 2009. They sang a total of 20 minutes, as a prelude to the ceremony.

Before Cuba was recently opened to US citizens to visit, the Premier Ensemble toured there in July 2011, visiting Havana, Santa Clara, and Matanzas on an international tour.

They sang in the New York Biennial in 2016. They were the only group from outside NY invited to perform there.

In 2017, they sang with the Knights at the SHIFT Festival, at the Kennedy Center.

In 2018, the group was invited to sing with Philip Glass at Carnegie Hall for his 80th birthday performance. They performed the ninety-minute Music With Changing Parts, the work's debut performance with women's chorus. This was an extremely important performance, as this composition is considered a piece that changed music in the 70's.

The Premier Ensemble has recorded and released nine solo CD recordings including: Voices of Hope and Peace that includes "Anne Frank: A Living Voice" by American composer Linda Tutas Haugen; Christmas, a selection of diverse holiday songs; Crossroads, a collection of world folk music; Music From the Venetian Ospedali, a disc of Italian Baroque music, for which The New Yorker proclaimed the Chorus "tremendously accomplished;" and Heaven and Earth, using recordings from 2008–09. This CD is their first double-disc release. The Premier Ensemble's February 2018 solo CD recording, Final Answer, was released on Philip Glass's Orange Mountain Music label and features works by composers Philip Glass, Lisa Bielawa, Gabriel Kahane, John Zorn, Carla Kihlstedt, Aleksandra Vrebalov, Sahba Aminikia, Matthew Welch and Theo Bleckmann. This album gives light to a more modern, contemporary take on choral music, reflecting SFGC's longstanding commitment to championing music of our time.

Their most recent album, My Outstretched Hand, released in 2019 by Supertrain Records, features the world premiere of Colin Jacobsen's three-movement (although only two appear on the album) piece If I Were Not Me as well as Lisa Bielawa's My Outstretched Hand, previously performed at the Kennedy Center, and the two-movement Remembering the Sea by Aaron Jay Kernis. 

The Premier Ensemble can also be heard on several recordings with the San Francisco Symphony, including five GRAMMY award-winning CDs Orff: Carmina Burana (1992); Stravinsky: The Firebird, The Rite of Spring, Persephone (1999); Mahler: Symphony No. 8 (2008); and Mahler: Symphony No. 3 and Kindertotenlieder (2004). The Premier Ensemble has appeared in two feature films and one Netflix documentary, The Talented Mr. Ripley (2000), What Dreams May Come (1998), and Athlete A (2020).

Kanbar Center
The Kanbar Performing Arts Center, opened in 2005, at 44 Page Street in San Francisco, is home of the San Francisco Girls Chorus.

Summer Music Camp
Each summer, SFGC holds a week-long chorus camp for choristers in its Levels II, III, IV ensembles and the Premier Ensemble at the Rio Lindo Adventist Academy in Healdsburg, California. During this camp, the young women prepare their music for the regular season, have classes in Music Theory, Sightsinging, and Dance. They also participate in fun activities such as the Counselor Hunt, Big Sister/Little Sister Night and the Square Dance.

Discography
My Outstretched Hand (2019)
Final Answer (2018)
Heaven and Earth (2009) 
Voices of Hope and Peace (2006)
Christmas (2003)
Crossroads (2000)
Music from the Venetian Ospedali (1998)
I Never Saw Another Butterfly; Songs of the Twentieth Century (1996)
A San Francisco Christmas (1996)

SFGC Music

Awards and honors
The San Francisco Girls Chorus's Premier Ensemble was invited to perform along with the San Francisco Boys Chorus in Washington D.C. on January 20, 2009 as part of the historic swearing-in ceremonies of President Barack Obama. SFGC and SFBC were the only children's choruses to receive this honor.
Five GRAMMY Awards, received for collaborations with the San Francisco Symphony on: Orff: Carmina Burana (1992), Stravinsky: The Firebird, The Rite of Spring, Persephone (1999), and Mahler: Symphony No. 3 and Kindertotenlieder (2004).
Winner of 4 Chorus America/ASCAP Awards for Adventurous Programming of Contemporary Music which recognized the Chorus's programming during the 2000, 2004, 2011, and 2017 seasons. 
First youth chorus to win the Margaret Hillis Achievement Award for Choral Excellence presented by Chorus America (2002).
Voted Best Choral Group in the Bay Area in 2017 by the readers of San Francisco Classical Voice
June 2018 performances of Purcell Dido and Aeneas with Voices of Music for the Berkeley Festival & Exhibition voted Best Operatic Performance, Best Choral Performance, and Best Baroque/Early Music Performance in the Bay Area in 2018 by the readers of San Francisco Classical Voice
One of only eleven San Francisco arts organizations and the only choral organization, as well as the first youth chorus, to be awarded a Wallace Foundation Excellence Award (2007).
Wayne Brown, Director of Music, National Endowment for the Arts, presented the Chorus with a Chorus America Award recognizing the Girls Chorus' artistic excellence for its performance on San Francisco Symphony's Grammy Award-winning recording, Stravinsky (2000).
Awarded Selected Performer at the 7th World Symposium on Choral Music, Kyoto, Japan (August 2005).

References

External links
Official website
 Official Myspace
 Official website

Choirs of children
Organizations based in San Francisco
Choirs in the San Francisco Bay Area
Musical groups from San Francisco
Musical groups established in 1979
1979 establishments in California
History of women in California